<mapframe
text="Borden Peninsula"
width=242
height=242
zoom=5
latitude=72.999722
longitude=-83/>
The Borden Peninsula is a peninsula on northern Baffin Island, in Nunavut, Canada. It lies some 80 km south of Devon Island (Cape Warrender), from which it is separated by Lancaster Sound. Northeastern Borden Peninsula is home to Sirmilik National Park.

Geography

The Magda Plateau is to the south where river valleys occupy the land, dividing scarps and flat-topped hills. 10 to 35 km wide Admiralty Inlet forms a western border, west of which is Brodeur Peninsula. 8 to 20 km wide Navy Board Inlet forms a border to the east, separating the peninsula from Bylot Island.

Population
The Inuit community of Arctic Bay is on the western coast.

Industry
The peninsula has seen mining activity for decades, especially for diamonds.

References

Borden Peninsula at the Atlas of Canada

External links

Peninsulas of Baffin Island